The New Jersey State Commission of Investigation (SCI) is an independent governmental fact-finding agency in the U.S. State of New Jersey whose mission is to identify and investigate organized crime, corruption and waste, fraud and abuse in government spending by state, municipal and school bodies.

History
The SCI was established in 1969 as an independent agency funded directly by the New Jersey Legislature.

No more than two of the Commission's four members may be of the same political party, and its members are appointed by the Governor of New Jersey, the President of the New Jersey Senate and the Speaker of the New Jersey General Assembly, to serve three-year terms on a staggered basis. Members and staff of the SCI are prohibited from participating in non-federal political activity in New Jersey.

The Governor, members of the Legislature, and other public officials at the federal, state, county and local level can refer matters to the Commission, as can average taxpayers. The SCI is an investigative body that operates in the fashion of an inspector general. It conducts fact-finding probes, often targeting wasteful and abusive governmental practices, and makes the results public even if no criminal prosecution is contemplated. The SCI is required by law to pursue these investigations beyond the sphere of political influence or favoritism and is required to make its findings public through written reports and/or public hearings. Since the SCI does not have prosecutorial functions, it is required to refer information of possible criminality to the appropriate authorities.

See also

 List of law enforcement agencies in New Jersey

External links
New Jersey State Commission of Investigation

Investigation
1969 establishments in New Jersey